It was a Dacian fortified town.

See also
Castra of Bucium

References

Dacian fortresses in Hunedoara County
Historic monuments in Hunedoara County